The 1994 Atlantic 10 Conference Baseball Championship was held at Bear Stadium in Boyertown, Pennsylvania from May 13 through 15. The double elimination tournament featured the league's top four regular-season finishers. Second-seeded West Virginia defeated St. Bonaventure in the title game to win the tournament for the fourth time, earning the Atlantic 10's automatic bid to the 1994 NCAA Tournament.

Seeding and format 
The league's top four teams, based on winning percentage in the 24-game regular-season schedule, were seeded one through four.

Bracket

All-Tournament 
West Virginia's Mark Landers was named Most Outstanding Player. His teammate Ryan Williams was named Most Outstanding Pitcher.

References 

Atlantic 10 Conference tournament
Atlantic 10 Conference Baseball Tournament
Atlantic 10 Conference baseball tournament
Atlantic 10 Conference baseball tournament
Baseball in Pennsylvania
College sports in Pennsylvania
History of Berks County, Pennsylvania
Sports competitions in Pennsylvania
Sports in the Delaware Valley
Tourist attractions in Berks County, Pennsylvania